Mill Creek is a river in the U.S. state of Texas, draining into the Brazos River.

See also
List of rivers of Texas

References

USGS Geographic Names Information Service
Texas State Historical Association Handbook of Texas: Mill Creek (Washington County)
USGS Hydrologic Unit Map - State of Texas (1974)

Brazos River
Rivers of Texas